The 2015 Nürnberger Versicherungscup was a professional tennis tournament played on clay courts. It was the 3rd edition of the tournament, and part of the 2015 WTA Tour. It took place in Nuremberg, Germany, on 17–23 May 2015.

Points and prize money

Point distribution

Prize money

Singles main draw entrants

Seeds 

 1 Rankings as of May 11, 2015.

Other entrants 
The following players received wildcards into the singles main draw:
  Anna-Lena Friedsam
  Antonia Lottner
  Tatjana Maria

The following players received entry from the qualifying draw:
  Misaki Doi
  Andreea Mitu
  Rebecca Peterson
  Yulia Putintseva
  Alison Van Uytvanck
  Renata Voráčová

Withdrawals 
Before the tournament
  Alexandra Dulgheru →replaced by Evgeniya Rodina
  Daria Gavrilova →replaced by Yanina Wickmayer
  Marina Erakovic →replaced by Kiki Bertens
  Kirsten Flipkens →replaced by Tímea Babos

During the tournament
  Angelique Kerber

Retirements 
  Andrea Petkovic

Doubles main draw entrants

Seeds 

1 Rankings as of May 11, 2015.

Other entrants 
The following pair received a wildcard into the doubles main draw:
  Anna-Lena Friedsam /  Carina Witthöft
  Katharina Gerlach /  Lena Rüffer

Champions

Singles 

  Karin Knapp def.  Roberta Vinci,  7–6(7–5), 4–6, 6–1

Doubles 

  Chan Hao-ching /  Anabel Medina Garrigues def.  Lara Arruabarrena /  Raluca Olaru, 6–4, 7–6(7–5)

External links

References 

2015 WTA Tour
2015
2015 in German tennis